Polyarthra is a genus of rotifers belonging to the family Synchaetidae.

The genus has almost cosmopolitan distribution.

Species:
 Polyarthra bicerca Wulfert, 1956 
 Polyarthra dissimulans Nipkow, 1952

References

Ploima